Hanan Ahmed Khaled (born 23 March 1963) is an Egyptian female former track and field athlete, who specialised in the shot put and discus throw events.

She is the most successful female athlete in the history of Egyptian track and field, winning a total of two gold medals in All-Africa Games, four gold, five silver and two bronze medals in African Athletics Championships in discus throw and shot put. She represented her country at the World Championships in Athletics in 1987, 1991 and 1995.

At both the 1988 and 1989 African Championships in Athletics she won the shot put and was runner-up in the discus.

At national level, she won ten shot put titles and eleven discus throw titles, including an undefeated streak in both from 1987 to 1992. She was also her country's first ever hammer throw champion, upon the event's introduction at the national championships in 1998.

She also played football (soccer) and is now a football referee.

International competitions

 Bronze at the 1989 Jeux de la Francophonie in the women's discus throw
 Winner of Discus throw and Shot put in 1991 All-Africa Games
 Gold medal African championship in Shot put 1988, 1989, 1990, 1996
 Silver medal African championship in Shot put 1992, 1996
 Silver medal African championship in Discus throw 1988, 1989, 1990
 Bronze medal African championship in Shot put 1998
 Bronze medal African championship in Discus throw 1998

See also
List of champions of the African Athletics Championships
List of Egyptian athletes

References

Egyptian female shot putters
1968 births
Living people
World Athletics Championships athletes for Egypt
Egyptian women's footballers
African Games gold medalists for Egypt
African Games medalists in athletics (track and field)
Women's association footballers not categorized by position
Athletes (track and field) at the 1987 All-Africa Games